3 & 3 Quarters is a compilation album by American psychedelic rock band Radio Moscow. Released on April 17, 2012, it was recorded and produced in 2003 by frontman Parker Griggs before the formation of the band when he called himself Garbage Composal.

Track listing

Personnel
Parker Griggs – vocals, guitar, bass, drums, organ, percussion, production, liner notes
Dave Cooley – mastering

References

2012 compilation albums
Radio Moscow (band) albums
Alive Naturalsound Records albums